Alan Theodore Sherman (born February 26, 1957) is a full professor of computer science at UMBC, director of the UMBC Center for Information Security and Assurance (CISA), and director of the UMBC Chess Program. Sherman is an editor for Cryptologia, and is a member of Phi Beta Kappa and Sigma Xi.

Biography

Education
Sherman earned a Bachelor's degree in Mathematics from Brown University in 1978, a Master's Degree in Electrical Engineering and Computer Science from MIT in 1981, and a Ph.D. degree in Computer Science from MIT in 1987.  Professor Sherman's research interests include security of voting systems, cryptology, information assurance, and discrete algorithms.

Chess
Sherman has been the faculty advisor of the UMBC Chess Club since 1991, after playing in a student vs. faculty match . He recruits chess players worldwide with academic scholarships . UMBC has been ranked among the best college teams, winning the Pan American Intercollegiate Team Chess Championship in 1996, 1998, 1999, 2000, 2001, 2002, 2005, 2008, 2009, and 2012. In 1997 he received a Meritorious Service Award from the USCF for his contributions to college chess .

Bibliography

Books

Significant academic articles
 Fisher, K. and Carback, R. and Sherman, A., Punchscan: Introduction and System Definition of a High-Integrity Election System, Proceedings of the IAVoSS Workshop On Trustworthy Elections (WOTE'06), Cambridge, UK, June 2006.
 David Chaum, Carback, R., Clark, J., Essex, A., Popoveniuc, S., Ronald Rivest, Ryan, P., Shen, E., and Sherman, A., Scantegrity II: end-to-end verifiability for optical scan election systems using invisible ink confirmation codes, Proceedings of the conference on Electronic voting technology, p. 1-13, July 28–29, 2008, San Jose, CA.
 Sherman, A. and McGrew, D., Key Establishment in Large Dynamic Groups Using One-Way Function Trees, IEEE Transactions on Software Engineering, v.29 n.5, May, 2003.
 Sherman, A., Kaliski, B. and Ronald Rivest, Is the Data Encryption Standard a group? (Results of cycling experiments on DES), Journal of Cryptology, v.1, n.1, 1998.
 Baldwin, R. and Sherman, A., How we solved the $100,000 Decipher Puzzle (16 hours too late), Cryptologia, XXIV:3, July, 1990.

External links
 List of Alan Sherman's publications on DBLP
 List of Alan Sherman's patents on USPTO
 Home page of Alan T. Sherman

References

People from Cambridge, Massachusetts
American computer scientists
MIT School of Engineering alumni
University of Maryland, Baltimore County faculty
Election technology people
People associated with computer security
Living people
1957 births
Brown University alumni